Execute is the debut album of So Solid Crew members Oxide & Neutrino, released on 28 May 2001. It features the Casualty sampling number 1 single "Bound 4 da Reload (Casualty)" and the Prodigy cover "No Good 4 Me". The song "Devil's Nightmare" was also featured on the Lara Croft: Tomb Raider soundtrack.

Track listing
"Execute"
"No Good 4 Me" (featuring Megaman, Romeo and Lisa Maffia)
"Up Middle Finger" 
"Foot 2 da Floor"
"Don't Give a Damn" (featuring Harvey)
"Setting da Pace"
"Bound 4 da Reload (Casualty)"
"Fighting Machine" (featuring Kaish)
"Remy on da Floor" (featuring Megaman)
"Devil's Nightmare" 
"Back 2 da Floor"
"Nuff of Dem Watch Me"
"N Digga Dee"
"Only Wanna Know U Cos Ure Famous"
"Check Dis" (featuring Asher D)

Critical reception
Q magazine included Execute on their 50 best albums of 2001 list.

"Up Middle Finger" won Best Video at the 2001 MOBO Awards.

Chart positions
{|
| width="auto" valign="top" |

Weekly charts

Year-end charts

Singles

Certifications

References

2001 debut albums
Oxide & Neutrino albums